Paju Citizen Football Club (Hangul: 파주 시민축구단) is a South Korean football club based in the city of Paju. 
The club is a member of the K3 League, a semi-professional league and the third tier of semi professional football in South Korea.

It was founded on 16 February 2012 and continuously a member of the league from 2012 season.

In 2020 season, Paju Citizen Champions of K4 League for the first time in history as fourth tier in South Korean football and promoted to K3 League for the first time history as semi-professional in South Korean football for the next season.

Honours
Challengers League / K3 League
Winners (0):
Runners-up (1): 2013
K4 League
Winners (1): 2020

Season by season records

Current squad
As of 2 July 2022

References

K4 League clubs
K3 League (2007–2019) clubs
Sport in Gyeonggi Province
Paju
Association football clubs established in 2012
2012 establishments in South Korea